He's Not Heavy may refer to:

 He's Not Heavy (film), a 1998 film directed by Bo Svenson
 "He's Not Heavy", an episode of Mysterious Island

See also 
 He Ain't Heavy (disambiguation)
 He Ain't Heavy, He's My Brother (disambiguation)